Gad Eitan Lerner (born 7 December 1954) is an Italian journalist, writer and TV presenter.

Career
 
In 2000, Lerner served as director of news broadcasts TG1 for Rai 1 but resigned after a selection of pornographic footage was mistakenly aired on prime time during his news broadcast on TG1. Along with his resignation, he revealed that a politician from National Alliance, Mario Landolfi, who also was the president of the parliamentary commission of vigilance regarding the public TV broadcasting service, asked him to favour an acquaintance of his in the TG1.

In 2001, Lerner participated in the foundation of new Italian TV channel La7, where he was the first director of the news program TG La7 for a short time and after he hosted a weekly talk show L'Infedele until 2012. He left La7 in 2013 and has since curated and developed other TV programs, including the talk show Fischia il vento for La EFFE and a documentary series Operai for RAI 3.

In 2010, he was denied visa to Syria, even after his friend and journalist Alix Van Buren defended him: "He often defends the Muslim communities in Italy and their right to have mosques ... he is an independent Jew, who doesn't belong to any lobby ..., he signed a petition written by a group of European Jews which opposes some of the politics of Israeli prime minister Benjamin Netanyahu."

In 2007, Lerner was one of the founding members of the Democratic Party (PD) in Italy. In 2017, Lerner resigned from the PD in protest against the party's politics over immigration.

Selected bibliography
 2005: Tu sei un bastardo. Contro l'abuso delle identità.
 2009: Scintille. Una storia di anime vagabonde.
 2017: Concetta. Una storia operaia.

References

External links

1954 births
Living people
Italian communists
Writers from Beirut
Writers from Turin
Jewish Italian writers
Jewish socialists
Italian people of Lebanese-Jewish descent
Italian newspaper editors
Italian male journalists
Lebanese emigrants to Italy
20th-century Italian Jews